The 2011–12 Lithuanian Football Cup was the 23rd season of the Lithuanian annual football knock-out tournament. The competition started on 5 June 2011 with the matches of the first round and ended on 20 May 2012. Ekranas were the defending champions.

The winners will qualify for the second qualifying round of the 2012–13 UEFA Europa League.

First round
The matches were played around 5 June 2011.

|}

Second round
The matches were played around 3 July 2011.

|}

Third round
The matches were played between 23 August and 9 September 2011.

|}

Fourth round
These matches were played on 27 and 28 September 2011.

|}

Fifth round
These matches took place on 18 and 19 October 2011.

|}

Quarterfinals
These matches took place on 2 November 2011.

|}

Semifinals
The 4 winners from the previous round entered this stage of the competition. Unlike the previous rounds of the competition, this was played over two legs. The first legs were played on 11 April 2012 and the second legs were played on 25 April 2012.

|}

Final

References

External links
 omnitel.net

Cup
Cup
2011–12 domestic association football cups
2011-12